Zero Point Zero is the first studio album by the rock band Desario. It was released in 2009 on Darla Records. The album drew comparisons with Franz Ferdinand, Vampire Weekend, The Replacements, and the Smoking Popes.

Track listing
 "Nautical Ways"
 "Late Sedan"
 "Cane Cola"
 "Fine Time"
 "Drama Club"
 "Smile With Your Mouth Closed" 
 "Houston"
 "Rain and Gold"
 "As I Recall"
 "Sequoia Gee"

Reviews
babysue

References

2009 debut albums
Desario albums